Branlebas was the name ship of her class of destroyers built for the French Navy in the first decade of the 20th century.

During World War I, Branlebas struck a mine and sank in the North Sea between Dunkirk, France, and Nieuwpoort, Belgium, on 30 September 1915.

Design
Like all the 300-tonne destroyers, the Branlebas class had a turtledeck forecastle with a flying deck, raised above the hull, aft.

A  belt of armour was fitted to protect the ship's boilers and machinery from splinters. The class was built with the standard gun armament for the 300-tonne destroyers, with a single  forward, backed up by six  guns, while two 450 mm (17.7 in) torpedo tubes were carried. The ships had a complement of 4 officers and 56 men.

Construction and service
She reached a speed of  during sea trials.

References

Bibliography

 
 

Branlebas-class destroyers
Ships built in France
1907 ships
Maritime incidents in 1915
Ships sunk by mines
World War I shipwrecks in the North Sea